Beaches Resorts is an operator of all-inclusive resorts for couples & families in the Caribbean, founded in 1997. Beaches Resorts and Sandals Resorts are part of Sandals Resorts International (SRI) which is a parent company to five resort brands across seven countries.

Locations

The locations operated by Beaches Resorts are:
Beaches Negril
Beaches Ocho Rios
Beaches Turks & Caicos

There is another Beaches Resort scheduled to be built on the site of the former Buccament Bay Resort in Buccament Bay, Saint Vincent and The Grenadines.

Leadership

Gordon "Butch" Stewart, Chairman and Founder:

Gordon “Butch” Stewart (1941-2021) was the businessperson who founded and owned Beaches Resorts.

Adam Stewart, Executive Chairman:

Adam Stewart (1981-) is the son of Gordon “Butch” Stewart and is the Executive Chairman of Sandals Resorts International (SRI). 

Gebhard Rainer, CEO:

Appointed CEO in March 2018, Rainer's appointment marks the first time a non-family member has held the post. He is responsible for all areas of SRI operations.

Awards

Beaches Resorts have won the following awards:

World's Leading Family Resort Brand. Awarded by the World Travel Awards and won for 25 consecutive years 
Various level International Star Diamond Awards from the American Academy of Hospitality Sciences:
Six Star Diamond Award for "Keeping it Green" at the Ocho Rios resort
Six Star Diamond Award for their "Italian Village" at the Negril resort
Five Star Diamond Award for the resort itself, the Le Petit Chateau Restaurant and Mario's Restaurant at the Turks and Caicos location
Five Star Diamond Award for the resort itself at the Negril location
Various TravelAge West WAVE (Western Agents’ Votes of Excellence) Awards:
Best Hotel Brand for Families in 2019
Best New Property or Major Renovation, Caribbean in  2014
Best Resort for Families, Caribbean 2013.
Macaroni Kid Family Travel Gold Daisy Award for Best All-Inclusive Resort in 2015.
Various awards from Islands.com:
Best Butler Service: Readers' Choice in 2020.
Best Included Amenity: Readers' Choice in 2020
Best for Families: Editors' Choice and Readers' Choice award in 2019.
Various Travvy Awards presented by travAlliancemedia:
Best All-Inclusive Family Resort- Caribbean 6 years consecutively from 2017 to 2022. 
Best Family Hotel/Resort, Caribbean/Bahamas Silver award 2019.
Various [Travel Weekly] awards:
Family Resort/Hotel Gold awards in 2011, 2012, 2013, 2015, 2016, 2018 and 2022; and Silver awards in 2010 and 2021.
Beach Resort/Hotel Gold award in 2010.
The Eco-Friendly Gold award in 2013, and silver award in 2016.
Overall Special Needs for Hospitality Gold award for Beaches Resorts' Autism Program in 2021.

References

External links
Beaches Resorts – Official website
Beaches Resorts – Official UK website
Beaches Resorts Facebook page

Hotel chains
Hotels established in 1997
Hotels in Jamaica
Hospitality companies of Jamaica
Tourism in the Turks and Caicos Islands